Piletocera hemiphaealis is a moth in the family Crambidae. It was described by George Hampson in 1907. It is found in Kenya and South Africa.

References

hemiphaealis
Moths described in 1907
Taxa named by George Hampson
Moths of Africa